The Vestibule (The Rotonda), (The Atrium), is the first section of the imperial corridor in Diocletian's Palace that led from the Peristyle, which was once the formal entrance to the imperial apartments.

History
Built up to the beginning of the 4th century, as the original part of the ancient palace. It is a circular hall, once topped with a dome, 17 meters in height and 12 meters in diameter. Built as a grand meeting hall only for and selected audiences such as ambassadors. The entrance was adorned with a large door dimension of 2.56 x 3.96 ms with an abundance of relief decorations. The Vestibula area was cleared of four semicircular niches that were filled with statues of unknown deities. Southeast of the vestibule is the Medieval quarter, where the oldest building is the early Romanesque house from the 10th century. On the opposite, inside the church of St. Andrija (now part of the Ethnographic museum).

Today
The space is used by klapa groups to perform popular folk songs during the summer months, taking advantage of the acoustics for an a cappella performance.

Gallery

See also

List of Roman domes
 Cellars of Diocletian's Palace
 Diocletian's Palace
 The Bronze Gate (Diocletian's Palace)
 The Iron Gate (Diocletian's Palace)
 The Golden Gate (Diocletian's Palace)
 The Golden Gate (Constantinople), Imperial entrance gate of the city of Constantinople, present-day Istanbul, Turkey
 Red Peristyle (an act of urban intervention done on the main square of the palace)
 Roman architecture
 Marjan, Croatia
 Salona
 Dalmatia

References

Further reading 
 Prijatelj, Kruno, Spomenici Splita i okolice, eX Libris, Split-Zagreb, 2005. 
 Šušnjar, Bogdan, Villa cara Dioklecijana u Splitu, Naklada Bošković, Split, 2003.

External links

 Zlatna vrata u Splitu - putovnica.net (accessed 23.06.2019.) 
 Zlatna vrata - split.hr (accessed 23.06.2019.) 
 Zlatna vrata - visitsplit.com (accessed 23.06.2019.) 

World Heritage Sites in Croatia
Archaeological sites in Croatia
Buildings and structures in Split, Croatia
Ancient Roman buildings and structures in Croatia
Tourist attractions in Split-Dalmatia County